The Myers Baronetcy was a title in the Baronetage of the United Kingdom. It was created on 3 July 1804 for Lieutenant-General William Myers, Commander of the British Forces in the West Indies. The title became extinct in 1811 on the death of the second Baronet, who was killed in action at the Battle of Albuera.

Myers baronets (1804)
Sir William Myers, 1st Baronet (1751–1805)
Sir William James Myers, 2nd Baronet (1783–1811)

References

Bibliography
A Genealogical and Heraldic History of the Extinct and Dormant Baronetcies in England, Ireland and Scotland, compiled by J. Burke and J.B. Burke, 2nd edition. 1844. London, UK: John Russell Smith.

Extinct baronetcies in the Baronetage of the United Kingdom